Everett Marshall (December 31, 1901 – April 3, 1965) was an American singer and actor who performed at the Metropolitan Opera, in Broadway revues, and in early musical films.

Career 
Marshall sang with the Metropolitan Opera from 1927 to 1931. He moved into lighter musical productions, appearing in George White's Scandals in 1931 and both the Ziegfeld Follies and Calling All Stars in 1934. Three of the songs that he debuted in these shows became standards that were later recorded by many artists: "The Thrill is Gone" (with Rudy Vallée, September 14, 1931), "Wagon Wheels" (January 4, 1934), and "What is There to Say?" (with Jane Froman, January 4, 1934).

He acted and sang in several films, including 1930's Dixiana as leading man Carl Van Horn, and 1935's I Live for Love as Roger Kerry. Throughout the 1940s he performed with touring companies of vintage operettas such as Blossom Time and The Student Prince, sometimes paired with Ann Pennington.

Filmography

References

External links 

Rotten Tomatoes profile

1901 births
1965 deaths
20th-century American singers